Mammillaria glochidiata is a species of plant in the family Cactaceae. It is endemic to Mexico. Its natural habitat is hot deserts. It was classed as Extinct in the wild but since 2013, it has been classed as Critically Endangered by the IUCN Red List.

References

glochidiata
Cacti of Mexico
Endemic flora of Mexico
Flora of Hidalgo (state)
Critically endangered biota of Mexico
Critically endangered flora of North America
Plants extinct in the wild
Taxonomy articles created by Polbot